Pilot was launched in 1813. She transported convicts to New South Wales in 1817. She disappeared in 1820.

Career
Pilot first appeared in Lloyd's Register in 1813 with Hall, master. The 1815 volume shows her master changing to Grice, her owner to Simes, and her trade to Cowes—Batavia.

On 9 March 1817 Captain William Pexton 1817 sailed from Cork for Port Jackson, and arrived there on 29 July 1817. She had embarked 119 male convicts, but only disembarked 117, though none of whom died en route. Presumably two may have been landed before she departed England.

Pilots surgeon-superintendent was Charles Queade. He had drawn up and issued to Captain Pexton and the commander of the guard a detailed set of instructions concerning the care and security of the convicts. When Pilot arrived at Port Jackson he passed a copy of these to Governor Lachlan Macquarie. By the mid-1820s the government itself developed and disseminated detailed regulations

After she delivered her convicts, Pilot sailed on 7 September for Hobart, and then in November for Batavia.

The Register of Shipping for 1819 showed Pilot with S. Owens, master, Somes, owner, and trade London—Ceylon.

Fate
On 28 May 1820 Pilot, Owen, master, sailed from Bengal for London. She was not heard of again.

Citations and references
Citations

References

1813 ships
Ships built by Temple shipbuilders
Convict ships to New South Wales
Age of Sail merchant ships
Merchant ships of the United Kingdom
Maritime incidents in May 1820
Missing ships
Ships lost with all hands